The 2021–22 season was Pisa S.C.'s third consecutive season in second division of the Italian football league, the Serie B, and the 113th as a football club.

Players

First-team squad

Out on loan

Pre-season and friendlies

Competitions

Overall record

Serie B

League table

Results summary

Results by round

Matches
The league fixtures were announced on 24 July 2021.

Promotion play-offs

Coppa Italia

References

Pisa S.C.
Pisa